Edwin Osbourne Wilson is a former concert promoter and co-founder and owner of the Armadillo World Headquarters (1973–1980). The music venue led a music movement in Austin to national prominence from 1973 to 1980 as the birthplace of Texas progressive county, aka "redneck rock" – a fusion of country music and rock – later, more blues than rock.  It was a popular venue for Willie Nelson.  Wilson is the owner of two Threadgill's restaurants in Austin.  The original, which he purchased in the mid–1970s from John Kenneth Threadgill (1909–1987), was where Janis Joplin got her start.

Growing up 
Wilson graduated from McCallum High School, Austin, Texas, in the spring of 1963.  In the fall of 1963, he enrolled at the University of North Texas in Denton.  At North Texas, he joined the school's Folk Music Club, whose student members included Spencer Perskin, Steven Fromholz, Ray Wylie Hubbard, and Michael Martin Murphey.  The Folk Music Club was founded and sponsored by Stan Alexander (né Stanley Gerald Alexander; 1928–2017), an English professor who had been influenced by the music scene at Threadgill's in Austin while working on his doctorate at The University of Texas.

Bibliography 
 Threadgill's: The Cookbook, by Edwin O. Wilson, Longstreet Press (1996) & Eakin Press (2002); 
 Armadillo World Headquarters: A Memoir, by Eddie Wilson and Jesse Sublett, TSSI Publishing (publisher) and University of Texas Press (distributor) (2017);

References

External links 
 Eddie Wilson describes the first time he saw Janis Joplin
 Wisdom of Eddie Wilson from Threadgills North
 Discussion of Armadillo World Headquarters

People from Austin, Texas
University of North Texas alumni
North Texas Mean Green football players
Living people
Year of birth missing (living people)